Jesse André Kriel (born 15 February 1994)  is a South African professional rugby union player for the South Africa national team and Canon Eagles in the Japanese Top League. His regular playing position is as a utility back but can also play centre, wing or fullback. Kriel was part of the national team who won the Rugby World Cup in 2019.

Career

Youth

As a scholar at Maritzburg College, Kriel was selected in the  squad for the Under–18 Craven Week tournament, where his performance earned him an inclusion in the South African Schools side in 2012. He started in matches against France, and England and was an unused substitute against Wales in the three-match series played in August 2012.

After finishing school, Kriel – along with twin brother Dan – made the move to Pretoria to join the  prior to the 2013 season.

Despite not initially being named in the South Africa Under-20 squad for the 2013 IRB Junior World Championship, a hamstring injury suffered by Sergeal Petersen led to Kriel's inclusion into the squad.

Kriel appeared as a substitute in their first match of the competition and scored two tries in a comprehensive 97–0 victory over the United States. Further substitute appearances followed against England and France. He was an unused substitute in their semi-final match against Wales, before making his first start of the competition in the third-placed play-off match against New Zealand.

For the remainder of 2013, Kriel played more youth rugby for the Blue Bulls, scoring 42 points in ten matches to help the  win the 2013 Under-19 Provincial Championship competition and also making three appearances for the  side.

Kriel was included in the South Africa Under-20 side for the 2014 IRB Junior World Championship, and also named one of two vice-captains for the tournament.

Senior career

In June 2015, he extended his contract at the Bulls until October 2018, which was extended even more until October 2019 just two months later following Kriel's call-up to the South Africa squad.

South Africa

In June 2015, Kriel was named in an extended South Africa squad prior to the 2015 Rugby Championship. He started for South Africa in a warm-up match against a World XV, helping them to a 46–10 win. He was named in the squad for their opening Rugby Championship match against  and was named as the starting centre for the match to become Springbok Number 867. Not only was this match Kriel's test debut, but he also scored his first test try in the 44th minute of the match. However, he ended the match on the losing side, with a late Tevita Kuridrani try securing a 24–20 victory for Australia.

Kriel was named in South Africa's squad for the 2019 Rugby World Cup. However he had to withdraw through injury in the pool stage and was replaced by Damian Willemse. South Africa went on to win the tournament, defeating England in the final.

Personal
Kriel is the twin brother of Dan Kriel, both being professional South African rugby players and the great-grandson of John Hodgson (1909-1970), who played 15 games for the British and Irish Lions in the 1930s.

Notes

References

External links
 

South African rugby union players
Living people
1994 births
Rugby union players from Cape Town
Blue Bulls players
Bulls (rugby union) players
South Africa Under-20 international rugby union players
Rugby union fullbacks
South Africa international rugby union players
Rugby union centres
Rugby union wings
NTT DoCoMo Red Hurricanes Osaka players
Yokohama Canon Eagles players